Water Baby is a 2016 short film directed by Pia Shah and produced by Varun Shah. It featured Suhaas Ahuja as lead character. The film had won a National Film Award for Best First Non-Feature Film at the 65th National Film Awards. The award was presented by President Ram Nath Kovind.

Synopsis 
The film is about a bullied boy battling his own hydrophobia.

References

External links 
 

2016 films
2010s Konkani-language films
Indian short films